A vanishing point is a point in a perspective drawing onto which parallel lines appear to converge.

Vanishing point or Vanishing Point may also refer to:

Film and television
 Vanishing Point (1971 film), a film starring Barry Newman
 Vanishing Point (1997 film), a made-for-television remake of the 1971 version, starring Viggo Mortensen
 Vanishing Point (2012 film), a documentary about the Arctic
 Vanishing Point (2013), a musical film, contemporary version of the Pied Piper story, co-produced by Youth Music Theatre UK with Martin Wright for Gamelab
 "Vanishing Point", an episode of M.A.S.K., a 1985 animated television series 
 "Vanishing Point" (Star Trek: Enterprise), an episode of the 2002 TV series Star Trek: Enterprise
 "Vanishing Point", an episode of the 2002 science fiction series Odyssey 5
 "Vanishing Point" (Westworld), a 2018 episode of the 2016 American TV series Westworld

Literature
 Vanishing Point, a 1962 novel by Peter Weiss
 Vanishing Point (Victor Canning novel), 1982
 To the Vanishing Point, a 1988 novel by Alan Dean Foster
 Vanishing Point, a 1993 novel by Michaela Roessner
 Vanishing Point (Doctor Who), a 2001 novel 
 Vanishing Point (Markson novel), a 2004 novel by David Markson
 The Vanishing Point, a 2004 novel by Val McDermid
 Time Masters: Vanishing Point, a limited comic series starring Rip Hunter

Music
 Vanishing Point, an early 1990s Australian progressive metal band
 Vanishing Point, a 1997 album by Primal Scream
 Vanishing Point, a 2013 album by Mudhoney
 "Vanishing Point", a track from New Order's 1989 album Technique
 "Vanishing Point", a track from Coil's 1995 album Unnatural History II
 "Vanishing Point", a track from Apollo 440's 1997 album Electro Glide in Blue
 "Vanishing Point", a track from deadmau5's 2008 album At Play

Other uses
 Vanishing Point (CBC), a CBC Radio science fiction broadcast 1984–1990
 Vanishing Point (theatre company), a Glasgow theatre company formed in 1999
 Vanishing Point (video game), a 2001 video game for the Sony PlayStation and Sega Dreamcast
 Vanishing Point, a pen by Pilot
 Vanishing Point (Arrowverse), a fictional location in the Arrowverse franchise